Acroloxus pseudolacustris  is a species of very small freshwater snail, which because of their shape are known as limpets, aquatic pulmonate gastropods in the family Acroloxidae.

Distribution
This freshwater limpet is endemic to Gīlān Province in Iran; it also possibly occurs in Māzandarān Province.

References

Acroloxidae
Gastropods described in 2012
Endemic fauna of Iran